Walter Niederle (born 17 February 1921) was an Austrian field hockey player. He competed in the men's tournament at the 1948 Summer Olympics.

References

External links
 

1921 births
Possibly living people
Austrian male field hockey players
Olympic field hockey players of Austria
Field hockey players at the 1948 Summer Olympics
Place of birth missing (living people)